Dalmeny is a town in the central part of Saskatchewan, Canada, named after Dalmeny, Scotland. The town is located in the rural municipality of Corman Park, and is about 26.8 km north of Saskatoon. The Dominion Land Survey description of Dalmeny's location is Section 10 Twp 39 Rge 6 W3.

History
The Dalmeny district was first settled around 1900; many of the early settlers were Mennonites. The town site developed in 1904-1905 with the arrival of the Canadian National Railways Carlton branch line and the Winnipeg - Edmonton Main Line. A year later, the post office opened, the first grain elevator was built, and a general store was established.

The village's population growth was slow until the 1970s, when it became known as a bedroom community for people working in Saskatoon. The population grew from 417 to 1964 between 1971 and 1981. In 1983, the village was incorporated as a town.

The town's original hockey arena which was built in the early 1950s was replaced in 2003 with a state of the art new one

Demographics 

Education
 Prairie View School - Kindergarten to Grade 6
 Dalmeny High School - Grade 7 to 12
Both schools are part of Prairie Spirit School Division

Dalmeny SD#1681, Dalmeny Town SD# 2094, Rose Leaf SD #1681 and Willow Lake SD# 2081 were early one room school houses in this area.

Law enforcement

The town of Dalmeny operates a police force which consists of three officers. The Dalmeny Police Service works in partnership with the Royal Canadian Mounted Police along with Corman Park Police Service. As well, the Saskatoon Police Service provide additional support if and when needed.

References

External links

Towns in Saskatchewan
Corman Park No. 344, Saskatchewan
Division No. 11, Saskatchewan